Marist is a noun or adjective derived from the name Mary – in particular Mary the Mother of Jesus Christ. It may refer to:

Catholic religious orders or congregations
 Marist Brothers also known as the Little Brothers of Mary and the Marist Brothers of the Schools
 Society of Mary (Marists) also known as the Marist Fathers
 Marist Sisters, a Catholic religious congregation of women
 Missionary Sisters of the Society of Mary also known as The Marist Missionary Sisters

Sporting clubs
 Marist F.C., a football club in the Solomon Islands
 Marist St. Joseph, a club in Samoa
 Marista Rugby Club, a rugby union club in Argentina
 Wellington Marist, a club in Wellington, New Zealand
 Palmerston North Marist, a club in  Palmerston North, New Zealand
 Marist Saints, a rugby league club in Auckland, New Zealand
 Marist Brothers Old Boys RFC in Auckland, New Zealand
 Marist Rugby Club in Fiji

Schools

 Marist College, Athlone, a Catholic boys school in Athlone, Ireland
 Marist College, Poughkeepsie, New York, USA
 Marist Poll, survey
 Marist College Ashgrove, a Catholic boys' college located in Ashgrove, Australia
 Marist Catholic College North Shore, Coeducational Catholic K-12 school in North Sydney, Australia
 Marist College Eastwood, secondary day school for boys in Eastwood, Sydney, New South Wales, Australia
 Marist College Kogarah, secondary day school for boys in Kogarah, Sydney, New South Wales, Australia 
 Marist School - Marikina, Philippines, a private Catholic school for boys
 Marist High School (Chicago, Illinois) Chicago, USA
 Marist High School (New Jersey), USA
 Marist Catholic High School (Eugene, Oregon), USA
 Marist School (Georgia), USA
 The Marist School, Sunninghill, Berkshire, England
 Marist Brothers International School in Kobe, Japan
 Séminaire des Pères Maristes, in Quebec City, Canada
 Marist College Canberra, Canberra, Australia
 Colégio Marista Dom Silvério, a private school in Belo Horizonte, Brazil
 Colegio Marista Guaynabo, a private school in Puerto Rico, United States
 Marist Brothers High School in Fiji

Structures
 Marist Stadium, a sports stadium in Lotopa, Samoa
 Marist House, the Administration Centre of St Bede's College, Christchurch, New Zealand
 Villa Marista, a prison in Havana, Cuba
 Marista Hall, also known as Chevrolet Hall, a convention centre in Belo Horizonte, Brazil

See also
 
 Marista (disambiguation)